Alen Omić (born 6 May 1992) is a Slovenian professional basketball player for Cedevita Olimpija of the ABA League.

Professional career 
Omić started playing professional basketball for Zlatorog Laško. In 2009, he signed with Zlatorog and stayed with the club for three seasons until 2012.

On 30 August 2012, Omić signed a four-year deal with Union Olimpija.

In July 2014, Omić joined the Brooklyn Nets for the 2014 NBA Summer League. He returned to the Summer League the following year, for the Denver Nuggets.

On 1 August 2015, Omić signed a two-year deal with Gran Canaria. He made a good impression with Gran Canaria right from the start, and was named to the season's All-EuroCup First Team.

On 28 June 2016, Omić signed a two-year deal with Turkish club Anadolu Efes. On 16 January 2017, he left Efes, and signed with Spanish club Unicaja, for the rest of the season. In April 2017, he won the EuroCup with Unicaja after beating Valencia Basket in the Finals.

On 28 July 2017, Omić signed with Israeli club Hapoel Jerusalem for the 2017–18 season. On 20 January 2018, he left Hapoel and signed with Serbian club Crvena zvezda for the rest of the season.

On 2 January 2019, he signed with Olimpia Milano for the rest of the season.

On 24 June 2019, he signed with Joventut Badalona of the Liga ACB. Omić averaged 11.1 points and 6.5 rebounds per game. On 11 September 2020, he signed with JL Bourg Basket of the LNB Pro A. Omić averaged 11.4 points, 9.0 rebounds and 1.9 assists per game. On 23 November 2021, he signed with Cedevita Olimpija of the ABA League.

International career 
Omić made his debut for the senior Slovenian national team at the 2014 FIBA World Cup. He also represented Slovenia at the EuroBasket 2015, where they were eliminated by Latvia in the tournament's eighth finals.

Career statistics

EuroLeague 

|-
| style="text-align:left;"| 2012–13
| style="text-align:left;"| Union Olimpija
| 10 || 0 || 12.5 || .416 || .000 || .625 || 3.8 || .1 || .1 || .3 || 5.0 || 5.8
|-
| style="text-align:left;"| 2016–17
| style="text-align:left;"| Anadolu Efes
| 17 || 1 || 8.1 || .555 || .000 || .375 || 1.5 || .4 || .2 || .2 || 2.9 || 2.4
|-
| style="text-align:left;"| 2017–18
| style="text-align:left;"| Crvena zvezda
| 11 || 0 || 17.3 || .704 || .000 || .516 || 3.9 || .8 || .2 || .2 || 8.4 || 10.7
|- class="sortbottom"
| colspan=2 style="text-align:center;" |  Career
| 38 || 1 || 12.1 || .577 || .000 || .532 || 2.6 || .4 || .2 || .1 || 5.1 || 5.7

EuroCup 

|-
| style="text-align:left;"| 2013–14
| style="text-align:left;"| Union Olimpija
| 16 || 12 || 22.6 || .596 || .000 || .617 || 5.3 || .4 || .3 ||  1.1  || 9.3 || 12.4
|-
| style="text-align:left;"| 2014–15
| style="text-align:left;"| Union Olimpija
| 15 || 11 ||  24.5  || .538 || .000 ||  .661  || 7.0 || 1.2 ||  .7  || .7 || 12.0 || 16.2
|- class="sortbottom"
| style="text-align:left;"| 2015–16
| style="text-align:left;"| Gran Canaria
|  21  ||  13  || 24.3 ||  .633  || .000 || .640 ||  7.6  ||  1.4  || .4 || .2 ||  14.0  ||  19.2 
|- class="sortbottom"
| style="text-align:left;"| 2016–17
| style="text-align:left;"| Unicaja
| 11 || 5 || 20.2 || .542 || .000 || .462 || 5.5 || .6 || .3 || .3 || 6.4 || 9.7
|- class="sortbottom"
| style="text-align:left;"| Career
| style="text-align:left;"|
| 63 || 41 || 23.1 || .590 || .000 || .613 || 6.5 || 1.0 || .4 || .6 || 11.0 || 15.3

References

External links 
 Alen Omić at aba-liga.com
 Alen Omić at eurobasket.com
 Alen Omić at euroleague.net
 Alen Omić at fiba.com

1992 births
Living people
Sportspeople from Tuzla
2014 FIBA Basketball World Cup players
ABA League players
KK Zlatorog Laško players
KK Olimpija players
CB Gran Canaria players
Anadolu Efes S.K. players
Baloncesto Málaga players
Hapoel Jerusalem B.C. players
KK Crvena zvezda players
KK Budućnost players
Olimpia Milano players
Joventut Badalona players
JL Bourg-en-Bresse players
KK Cedevita Olimpija players
Basketball League of Serbia players
Bosnia and Herzegovina emigrants to Slovenia
Bosnia and Herzegovina expatriate basketball people in Serbia
Bosnia and Herzegovina expatriate basketball people in Spain
Centers (basketball)
Liga ACB players
Slovenian expatriate basketball people in Spain
Slovenian expatriate basketball people in Turkey
Slovenian expatriate basketball people in Israel
Slovenian expatriate basketball people in Serbia
Slovenian expatriate basketball people in Italy
Slovenian expatriate basketball people in France
Slovenian men's basketball players
Slovenian people of Bosnia and Herzegovina descent